Bangolan may refer to:
Bangolan language, of Cameroon
Bangolan, Iran, a village in Hormozgan Province, Iran